The 1901 Cheviot earthquake occurred at 07:47 NZT on 16 November 1901 (20:15 15 November UTC) with an estimated magnitude of 6.9, centred near the township of Cheviot in the Canterbury region of New Zealand.

Damage and casualties 

A baby was killed when a sod hut collapsed. Other casualties in the Canterbury region are not known.

The ChristChurch Cathedral experienced some damage in this earthquake. The top of the spire fell again as a result of the 16 November 1901 Cheviot earthquake. This time, the stone construction was replaced with a more resilient structure of Australian hardwood sheathed with weathered copper sheeting, with an internal mass damper.

Observations of sand blows (sand volcano) and lateral spreading, consistent with soil liquefaction phenomena in the township of Kaiapoi were reported in local newspapers in a two to three block area at the eastern end of Charles and Sewell Streets on the north bank of the Kaiapoi River, in addition to similar effects observed on the opposing river bank, and the road to Belfast.

See also
List of earthquakes in 1901
List of earthquakes in New Zealand

References

External links  

Hurunui District
1901 Cheviot earthquake
Cheviot Earthquake, 1901
Cheviot Earthquake, 1901
History of Canterbury, New Zealand
November 1901 events